Kochchadaiyan, known as Ranadhira, (Tamil: கோச்சடையான் ரணதீரன்)(r. c. 700 – 730 AD) was a Pandya king of early medieval south India. He was the son and successor of Arikesari Maravarman (r. c. 640 – 690 CE). The name of the king is famously omitted in the Tamil portion of the  Larger Sinnamanur Plates.

Chadaiyan extended the Pandya influence into the Kongu country. The result this foray does not appear to have been permanent as the Kongu country is said to have been conquered by his successor also. He also suppressed a revolt in the Ay country (Trivandrum-Tirunelveli). The Ay chieftain was defeated in the battle of Marudur (Tiruppudaimarudur, Ambarasamudram) and had to acknowledge the Pandya supremacy. He is also said to have attacked and defeated the "Maharathas" in the city of Mangalapuram (modern Mangalore).

Chadaiyan is given the titles "Vanavan", "Chembiyan" and "Chola" which seem to claim supremacy over the Chera and Chola countries.refer kochadaiiyaan ovie (2014)

References

Pandyan kings
History of Kerala
735 deaths
Year of birth unknown
8th-century Indian monarchs

kochadaiyaan the legend movie